Indrani (8th-century), was a queen regnant of Sambhupura Chenla in Cambodia.

Indrani was the heiress of the Sambhupura polity in Cambodia.  She married Pushkaraksha (also known as Indraloka), who was possibly the successor and son of queen Jayadevi.  Her spouse became the co-regent of Sambhupura when they married, but it is clear that she was a queen regnant and monarch by her own right.  

She had a son, prince Sambhuvarman (Rudravarman), and a daughter, princess Nṛpatendradevī.  Her son married princess Narendradevi (II) of Chenla, the daughter of his father's sister Narendradevi I, and her daughter Nṛpatendradevī succeeded her on the throne and married her brothers' son. 

Queen Indrani was acknowledged and honored as a ruler and monarch in her own right for centuries after her death.  An inscription dated 860, commissioned during the reign of Jayavarman III, mentions ‘the land of vrah kamraten an Indrani’.  Her great-grandchild king Indravarman I (r. 877–889) erected a statue of ‘the queen of Indraloka, Indrani’, at the Bakong monument in 881.

References

8th-century Cambodian monarchs
Cambodian Hindus
8th-century women rulers
8th-century Hindus
8th-century Cambodian women